see List of RLM aircraft for a numerical listing
or RLM aircraft designation system for explanation of naming system.

Albatros
Albatros Al 101, 'L 101', two-seat sportsplane + trainer, 1930
Albatros Al 102, 'L 102', two-seat sportsplane + trainer, 1931
Albatros Al 103, 'L 103', two-seat sportsplane + trainer, 1932

Arado
Arado Ar 64, fighter (biplane)
Arado Ar 65, fighter/trainer (biplane - re-engined Ar 64)
Arado Ar 66, trainer + night fighter
Arado Ar 67, fighter (biplane) (prototype)
Arado Ar 68, fighter (biplane)
Arado Ar 69, trainer (biplane) (prototypes), 1933
Arado Ar 76, fighter (biplane) + trainer
Arado Ar 80, fighter (prototype)
Arado Ar 81, two-seat biplane (prototype)(1936)
Arado Ar 95, coastal patrol + attack (biplane seaplane)
Arado Ar 96, trainer
Arado Ar 196, ship-borne reconnaissance + coastal patrol (seaplane)
Arado Ar 197, naval fighter (biplane - derived from Ar 68)
Arado Ar 198, reconnaissance
Arado Ar 199, seaplane trainer
Arado Ar 231, fold-wing U-boat reconnaissance aircraft (prototype)
Arado Ar 232, transport
Arado Ar 233, seaplane (concept), 1940
Arado Ar 234 Blitz ('Lightning'), bomber (jet-engined)
Arado Ar 240, heavy fighter + attack
Arado Ar 396, trainer
Arado Ar 440, heavy fighter + attack
Arado Ar 532, cancelled transport

Bachem
Bachem Ba 349  Natter (Adder or Viper), interceptor (rocket-engine)

Blohm & Voss
Blohm & Voss BV 40, glider interceptor
Blohm & Voss BV 138, flying-boat (early versions designated as Ha 138)
Blohm & Voss Ha 139, long-range seaplane
Blohm & Voss Ha 140, torpedo bomber flying-boat (prototype)
Blohm & Voss BV 141, reconnaissance (asymmetric)
Blohm & Voss BV 142, reconnaissance + transport
Blohm & Voss BV 143, glide bomb (prototype)
Blohm & Voss BV 144, transport
Blohm & Voss BV 155, high-altitude interceptor (formerly Me 155)
Blohm & Voss BV 222 Wiking (Viking), transport flying-boat
Blohm & Voss BV 238, flying-boat (prototype), largest Axis military aircraft design to fly
Blohm & Voss BV 246 Hagelkorn (Hailstone), long-range radar-homing glide bomb

Bücker
Bücker Bü 131 Jungmann (Young Man), trainer (biplane)
Bücker Bü 133 Jungmeister (Young Champion), trainer + aerobatics (biplane)
Bücker Bü 180 Student (Student), trainer
Bücker Bü 181 Bestmann (Bestman), trainer + transport
Bücker Bü 182 Kornett (Ensign), trainer

Deutsche Forschungsanstalt für Segelflug (DFS)
DFS 6, may be 'Model 6' or 'DFS B6'
DFS 39, Lippisch-designed tail-less research aircraft
DFS 40, Lippisch-designed tail-less research aircraft
DFS 194, rocket-powered research aircraft, forerunner of Me 163
DFS 228, rocket-powered reconnaissance aircraft (prototype only)
DFS 230, transport glider
DFS 331, transport glider (prototype)
DFS 332
DFS 346, supersonic research aircraft (incomplete prototype only)

Dornier
Dornier Do 10, (Do C1) fighter (prototype), 1931
Dornier Do 11, (Do F) medium bomber, 1931
Dornier Do 12, Libelle III (Dragonfly III), seaplane, 1932
Dornier Do 13, medium bomber, (Development of Do 11), 1933
Dornier Do 14, seaplane (prototype)
Dornier Do 15, prototype for a passenger plane and bomber (Do Y)
Dornier Do 16, Wal (Whale), reconnaissance flying-boat
Dornier Do 17, Flying Pencil; mail-plane, bomber, reconnaissance, night-fighter
Dornier Do 18, bomber + reconnaissance flying-boat, 1935
Dornier Do 19, four-engined Ural bomber heavy bomber contender (prototype)
Dornier Do 22, torpedo bomber + reconnaissance flying-boat
Dornier Do 23, medium bomber, (development of (Do 13/11)
Dornier Do 26, long-range seaplane
Dornier Do 214, transport flying-boat (prototype)
Dornier Do 215, bomber, night-fighter
Dornier Do 217, bomber, night-fighter
Dornier Do 317, Bomber B design competitor
Dornier Do 335 Pfeil (Arrow), fighter-bomber (push-pull engine configuration)
Dornier Do 435
Dornier Do 635

Fieseler Fieseler Flugzeugbau
Fieseler Fi 2 (F2 Tiger, acrobatic sportsplane, 1932
Fieseler Fi 5 (F-5) acrobatic sportsplane + trainer, 1933
Fieseler Fi 97, four-seat cabin touring monoplane
Fieseler Fi 98, biplane fighter, 1936
Fieseler Fi 103 (Vergeltungswaffe 1), flying bomb
Fieseler Fi 156 Storch (Stork), STOL reconnaissance aircraft
Fieseler Fi 167, ship-borne torpedo bomber + reconnaissance (biplane)
Fieseler Fi 333 transport (concept)

Flettner
Flettner Fl 184 reconnaissance helicopter, prototype
Flettner Fl 185 reconnaissance helicopter, prototype
Flettner Fl 265 reconnaissance helicopter, prototype
Flettner Fl 282 Kolibri (Hummingbird), reconnaissance helicopter
Flettner Fl 339 reconnaissance helicopter, project

Focke-Achgelis
Focke-Achgelis Fa 223 Drache (Kite), transport helicopter (prototype
Focke-Achgelis Fa 266 Hornisse (Hornet), helicopter (prototype)
Focke-Achgelis Fa 330, helicopter (prototype)
Focke-Achgelis Fa 336 scout helicopter (prototype), 1944

Focke-Wulf
Focke-Wulf Fw 44 Stieglitz (Goldfinch), trainer (biplane)
Focke-Wulf Fw 56 Stösser (Falcon Hawk), trainer (parasol monoplane)
Focke-Wulf Fw 57, heavy fighter + bomber (prototype)
Focke-Wulf Fw 58 Weihe (Kite), transport + trainer
Focke-Wulf Fw 61, helicopter (prototype)
Focke-Wulf Fw 62, ship-borne reconnaissance (biplane seaplane)
Focke-Wulf Ta 152, fighter (derived from Fw 190)
Focke-Wulf Ta 154 Moskito (Mosquito), night-fighter
Focke-Wulf Fw 159, fighter (prototype only)
Focke-Wulf Ta 183 Hückebein, jet-engined fighter (prototype)
Focke-Wulf Fw 186, autogiro reconnaissance aircraft (prototype)
Focke-Wulf Fw 187 Falke (Falcon), heavy fighter
Focke-Wulf Fw 189 Uhu (Eagle-owl), tactical reconnaissance
Focke-Wulf Fw 190 Würger (Shrike), fighter
Focke-Wulf Fw 191, Bomber B competitor
Focke-Wulf Fw 200 Condor, transport + maritime patrol-bomber
Focke-Wulf Fw 259 Frontjäger (concept)
Focke-Wulf Fw 300 proposed long-range version of Fw 200
Focke-Wulf Ta 400 proposed long-range Amerika Bomber
Focke-Wulf Fw 491, (Fw 391 development) (project)

Sportsflugzeuge Göppingen, "Göppingen"
Göppingen Gö 1 Wolf I sailplane, 1935
Göppingen Gö 3 Minimoa sailplane, 1936
Göppingen Gö 4 sailplane
Göppingen Gö 5 sailplane, 1937
Göppingen Gö 9 development pusher-prop aircraft for Do 335 Pfeil

Gothaer Waggonfabrik, "Gotha"
Gotha Go 145, trainer
Gotha Go 146, small transport (twin-engine), 1935
Gotha Go 147, STOL reconnaissance (prototype)
Gotha Go 229, fighter (flying-wing), alternative designation for the Horten Ho 229/Ho IX
Gotha Go 242, transport glider
Gotha Go 244, transport
Gotha Go 345, assault glider
Gotha Ka 430, transport glider

Heinkel
Heinkel He 37, fighter (biplane)
Heinkel He 38, fighter (biplane)
Heinkel He 43, fighter (biplane)
Heinkel He 45, bomber + trainer
Heinkel He 46, reconnaissance
Heinkel He 49, fighter (biplane)
Heinkel He 50, reconnaissance + dive bomber (biplane)
Heinkel He 51, fighter + close-support (biplane)
Heinkel He 59, reconnaissance (biplane seaplane)
Heinkel He 60, ship-borne reconnaissance (biplane seaplane)
Heinkel He 70, "Blitz" (Lightning), single-engine transport + mailplane, 1932
Heinkel He 72 Kadett (Cadet), trainer
Heinkel He 74, fighter + advanced trainer (prototype)
Heinkel He 100, fighter
Heinkel He 111, bomber
Heinkel He 112, fighter
Heinkel He 113, (alternative designation for He 100)
Heinkel He 114, reconnaissance seaplane
Heinkel He 115, general-purpose seaplane
Heinkel He 116, transport + reconnaissance
Heinkel He 119 single-engine high-speed bomber (prototypes), reconnaissance aircraft, 1937
Heinkel He 120 four-engine long-range passenger flying-boat(project), 1938
Heinkel He 162 Spatz (sparrow), winner of Germany's Volksjäger (People's Fighter) design competition, fighter (jet-engined)
Heinkel He 172, trainer (prototype)
Heinkel He 176, pioneering liquid-fuelled rocket-engined experimental aircraft (prototype)
Heinkel He 177 Greif (Griffon), long-range bomber
Heinkel He 178, pioneering jet-engined experimental aircraft
Heinkel He 219 Uhu (Eagle-Owl), night-fighter
Heinkel He 274, high-altitude bomber
Heinkel He 277, (from February 1943), never-built long-range bomber design (1943–44), entered in Amerika Bomber competition
Heinkel He 280, fighter (jet-engined)
Heinkel He 343, four jet engined bomber
Heinkel He 519, high-speed bomber (He 119 derivative) (project only), 1944

Henschel
Henschel Hs 117 Schmetterling (Butterfly), surface-to-air missile (rocket-engined)
Henschel Hs 121, fighter + trainer (prototype)
Henschel Hs 123, ground-attack (biplane)
Henschel Hs 124, heavy fighter + bomber (prototype)
Henschel Hs 125, fighter + trainer (prototype)
Henschel Hs 126, reconnaissance
Henschel Hs 127, jet-engined bomber (prototype)
Henschel Hs 129, ground-attack
Henschel Hs 130, high altitude reconnaissance + bomber, Bomber B late entrant (prototype)
Henschel Hs 132, dive bomber (jet-engined) (prototype)
Henschel Hs 293, glide bomb (rocket-powered)
Henschel Hs 294, anti-shipping glide bomb (rocket-powered)
Henschel Hs 297
Henschel Hs 298, air-to-air missile (rocket-powered)

Junkers
Junkers Ju 34, single-engine light transport+reconnaissance, 1933
Junkers Ju 52 Tante Ju (Auntie Ju), 3-engine transport + bomber
Junkers Ju 86, bomber + reconnaissance
Junkers Ju 87 Stuka, dive-bomber
Junkers Ju 88, bomber + reconnaissance + night-fighter
Junkers Ju 89, Ural bomber design contender for a heavy bomber (prototype)
Junkers Ju 90, bomber (prototype)
Junkers Ju 188, Rächer (avenger), bomber
Junkers Ju 248, re-designation of Me 263
Junkers Ju 252, 3-engine transport, replacement for Ju 52
Junkers Ju 287, heavy bomber (jet-engined) (prototype)
Junkers Ju 288, presumptive Bomber B competition winner, prototypes only
Junkers Ju 290, long-range bomber (prototype)
Junkers Ju 322 Mammut, transport glider (prototype), 1941
Junkers Ju 352 Herkules (Hercules), 3-engine transport, development of Ju 252
Junkers Ju 388 Störtebeker, reconnaissance + night-fighter
Junkers Ju 390, six-engined Amerika Bomber competitor
Junkers Ju 488, heavy bomber

Klemm
Klemm Kl 31, single-engine transport, 1931
Klemm Kl 32, single-engine transport, 1931
Klemm Kl 33, (Klemm L33), single-seat ultra-light sportplane (prototype), 1933
Klemm Kl 35, sportplane + trainer, 1935
Klemm Kl 36, single-engine transport, 1934

Kramer
Kramer Rk 344, air-to-air missile (rocket-powered)

Messerschmitt

Pre-July 1938 designs (from Bayerische Flugzeugwerke)
Messerschmitt Bf 108 Taifun (Typhoon), trainer + transport
Messerschmitt Bf 109, fighter
Messerschmitt Bf 110, heavy fighter + night-fighter
Messerschmitt Bf 161, reconnaissance aircraft (prototype)
Messerschmitt Bf 162, bomber (prototype)
Messerschmitt Bf 163 STOL reconnaissance aircraft (prototypes)

Post-July 1938 designs (from Messerschmitt Aktiengesellschaft)
Messerschmitt Me 163 Komet (Comet), interceptor (rocket-engined)
Messerschmitt Me 209, fighter + speed-record aircraft (prototype)
Messerschmitt Me 209-II, fighter (prototype - Bf 109 derivative)
Messerschmitt Me 210, heavy fighter + reconnaissance
Messerschmitt Me 261, long-range reconnaissance
Messerschmitt Me 262 Schwalbe (Swallow), fighter + attack (jet-engined)
Messerschmitt Me 263, interceptor (rocket-engined)
Messerschmitt Me 264, long-range bomber, primary Amerika Bomber competitor (prototype)
Messerschmitt Me 309, tricycle-geared fighter (prototype - Bf 109 derivative)
Messerschmitt Me 321 Gigant (Giant), transport glider
Messerschmitt Me 323 Gigant (Giant), 6-engined transport plane based on the 321 glider
Messerschmitt Me 409 heavy fighter, (Me 209 derivative) (project), 1944
Messerschmitt Me 410 Hornisse (Hornet), heavy fighter + reconnaissance
Messerschmitt Me 510 twin-engine fighter-bomber (Me 410 derivative) (project)
Messerschmitt Me 609 heavy fighter + bomber (project)

Siebel
Siebel Fh 104 Hallore, medium transport
Siebel Si 201, STOL reconnaissance aircraft (prototype)
Siebel Si 202 "Hummel" sportplane + trainer, 1938
Siebel Si 204, transport + aircrew trainer

Military aircraft designation systems